The Image of the City is a 1960 book by American urban theorist Kevin Lynch. The book is the result of a five-year study of Boston, Jersey City and Los Angeles on how observers take in information of the city, and use it to make mental maps. Lynch's conclusion was that people formed mental maps of their surroundings consisting of five basic elements.

Imageability
Lynch argues that for any given city, a corresponding set of mental images exist in the minds of the people who experience that city. Contributing to those images are five qualities which Lynch identifies as Paths, Edges, Districts, Nodes, and Landmarks.

 Paths
These are the streets, sidewalks, trails, canals, railroads, and other channels in which people travel
They arrange space and movement between space
 Edges
Boundaries
They can be either Real or Perceived
These are walls, buildings, and shorelines, curbstone, streets, overpasses, etc.
 Districts
Medium to large areas that are two-dimensional
An individual enters into and out of these areas
Have common identifying characteristics
 Nodes
Large areas you can enter, serve as the foci of the city, neighborhood, district, etc.
Offers the person in them multiple perspectives of the other core elements
"...the most successful node seemed both to be unique in some way and at the same time to intensify some surrounding characteristic"
 Landmarks
Points of reference person cannot enter into
These are buildings, signs, stores, mountains, public art
At least one aspect of them is unique or memorable in the context they exist
Mobile Points (such as Sun) can be used as well

Influence
The Image of the City has influenced the fields of environmental psychology and environmental behavior as well as a generation of researchers working within them. Researchers that include Amos Rapoport, Claire Cooper Marcus, Oscar Newman, William H. Whyte, Kenneth Craik and Donald Appleyard.

References

1960 non-fiction books
Books about urbanism
Design books
Urban planning
Architecture books
MIT Press books